Lat Yao is a khwaeng (subdistrict) of Chatuchak District, in Bangkok, Thailand. In 2020, it had a total population of 41,238 people.

Its name "Lat Yao" comes from a khlong (canal) in the same name that runs through this area. Lat Yao used to occupy the entire area of Chatuchak. Until in late 2003, the subdistrict was divided into five subdistricts, as in the present.

References

Subdistricts of Bangkok
Chatuchak district